Udny Green (Scottish Gaelic: Olldanaidh; Doric: Widnie Green) is a village in Aberdeenshire, Scotland, immediately southwest of Pitmedden. It is part of the parish of Udny along with another small settlement, Udny Station. Udny Parish Church is located beside the village green with the old kirkyard and Udny Mort House on the opposite side.

On 22 September 1943, the Royal Engineers were called out to Udny Castle to investigate reports of an unexploded bomb.  It turned out to be a "flash bomb" used by the Luftwaffe at night to illuminate the area for navigation or photographic uses.

Footnotes

Villages in Aberdeenshire